Welcome is a hamlet in Otsego County, New York, United States. It is located southeast of Garrattsville on Otsego County Route 16.

References

Geography of Otsego County, New York
Hamlets in Otsego County, New York